Amélie Cocheteux (born 27 March 1978) is a former professional tennis player from France. She reached her career high ranking of No. 55 in the world on 10 May 1999. She defeated world number ten Nathalie Tauziat in the Prostějov tournament in 1999. As a junior, she won the 1995 French Open title.

In 2000, Cocheteux and another French player, Anne-Gaëlle Sidot, were accused of racism by Alexandra Stevenson. Cocheteux allegedly used a racial remark to Stevenson whilst bumping into her in the locker room. Cocheteux denied the claims, and no action was taken by the WTA Tour.

Cocheteux's results seriously deteriorated throughout the year, ending it with an 8–26 record and dropping out of the top 100. In 2001, she played just three events on the ITF circuit, losing first round in all of them, and stopped playing on the women's tour at the age of just 23.

WTA finals

Doubles (0–1)

ITF Finals

Singles Finals (4-5)

Doubles Finals (0-3)

References

External links
 
 

1978 births
Living people
French female tennis players
French Open junior champions
Sportspeople from Amiens
Grand Slam (tennis) champions in girls' singles